Thomas Alberter Chandler (July 26, 1871 – June 22, 1953) was an American politician and a U.S. Representative from Oklahoma.

Biography
Born near Eucha, Delaware County, Indian Territory (now Oklahoma), Chandler was the son of Burges G. and Annie Gunter Chandler. He attended the public schools, Worcester Academy, Vinita, Indian Territory, in 1888, and, later, Drury College, Springfield, Missouri. In 1894 he married Marie L. Wainwright, and they had two children, Norma Louise and Collis.

Career
Chandler was appointed a Cherokee revenue collector in 1891. Served as a Cherokee town-site Commissioner from 1895–1898 and United States deputy clerk of the court for the northern district of Indian Territory from 1900–1907.

He studied law and was admitted to the bar in 1907 and commenced practice in Vinita, Indian Territory. He served as delegate to the Republican National Convention in 1908. He was member of the first Board of Public Affairs for the State of Oklahoma in 1909 and 1910. He resumed the practice of law, and also engaged in the production of oil, in agricultural pursuits, and in the real estate business.

Elected as a Republican to the 65th Congress, Chandler served from March 4, 1917 to March 3, 1919. He was an unsuccessful candidate for reelection in 1918 to the 66th Congress, but was elected to the 67th Congress, and served from March 4, 1921 to March 3, 1923.  Again an unsuccessful candidate for reelection in 1922 to the 68th Congress, he resumed the practice of law.

In 1927, he was convicted of fraud in federal court with six co-defendants.

Death
Chandler died in Vinita, Craig County, Oklahoma, on June 22, 1953 (age 81 years, 331 days). He is interred at Fairview Cemetery in Vinita.

References

External links 
 Encyclopedia of Oklahoma History and Culture - Chandler, Thomas
Thomas A. Chandler Collection at the Carl Albert Center
 

1871 births
1953 deaths
People from Vinita, Oklahoma
Oklahoma lawyers
Republican Party members of the United States House of Representatives from Oklahoma